The  (local nickname TDR) is a theme park and vacation resort located in Urayasu, Chiba, Japan, just east of Tokyo. The resort is fully owned and operated by The Oriental Land Company (a subsidiary of the Keisei Electric Railway Company) under a licence from The Walt Disney Company, who constructed and designed the resort and its various attractions.

The resort opened on April 15, 1983, as a single theme park (Tokyo Disneyland), later developing into a resort with a second theme park (Tokyo DisneySea), five Disney hotels, six non-Disney hotels and a shopping complex (Ikspiari). Tokyo Disneyland was the first Disney theme park to open outside the United States and the resort is the only Disney Parks resort in the world not owned or operated by The Walt Disney Company in any capacity.

Attractions

Tokyo Disney Resort consists of Tokyo Disneyland, Tokyo DisneySea, and Ikspiari, which is a variation of the Downtown Disney and Disney Springs shopping, dining, and entertainment areas found at the Disney resorts in Anaheim and Lake Buena Vista respectively. It also contains Bon Voyage!, a large Disney goods specialty shop.

Like other Disney resorts, the Tokyo Disney Resort includes several Disney-branded hotels; the resort's three "Deluxe" Hotels are the Disney Ambassador Hotel, the Tokyo DisneySea Hotel MiraCosta and the Tokyo Disneyland Hotel. The Resort also includes the "Moderate" type Tokyo Disney Resort Toy Story Hotel and the "Value" type Tokyo Disney Resort Celebration Hotel. There are six other hotels located on the Tokyo Disney Resort property. These, however, are not Disney-branded hotels and are owned by other companies, similar to the Hotel Plaza Boulevard hotels at Walt Disney World.

All facilities are linked by the Disney Resort Line monorail, with the exception of the Celebration Hotel which is connected to the resort area via a free 15-minute shuttle. The Tokyo Disney Resort is headed by Toshio Kagami, who is the representative director (CEO) of the Oriental Land Company.

Theme Parks
 Tokyo Disneyland, the first theme park built at the resort. Tokyo Disneyland opened on April 15, 1983 and is mostly based on its sister castle parks in Anaheim, California, and Bay Lake, Florida.
 Tokyo DisneySea, the second theme park to open at the resort.  Tokyo DisneySea opened on September 4, 2001 and is themed after nautical exploration, adventure, and different ports of call from around the world.

Shopping
Bon Voyage! - The resort's official Disney goods speciality shop.

Ikspiari

 is a shopping, dining, and entertainment complex at the Tokyo Disney Resort in Urayasu, Chiba, Japan. The complex is operated by IKSPIARI Co., Ltd., a subsidiary of the owner, The Oriental Land Company, it is the Japanese equivalent of the Downtown Disney complex at Disneyland Resort in Anaheim, California, Disney Springs at Walt Disney World Resort in Lake Buena Vista, Florida, and Disney Village at Disneyland Paris, France. Ikspiari is close to Maihama Station on the Keiyō Line from Tokyo, and is also served by Resort Gateway Station on the Disney Resort Line.

On , Create Restaurants Holdings Inc. fully acquired RC Japan Co., Ltd., the Rainforest Cafe franchisee, at the complex.

Hotels

Disney-Branded
 Disney Ambassador Hotel - Opened July 20, 2000 as the first official Disney hotel in the resort, featuring art deco theming.
 Tokyo DisneySea Hotel MiraCosta - Opened on September 4, 2001 in conjunction with Tokyo DisneySea Park. Several guest rooms overlook the park itself and the exterior of the hotel provides much of the theming for the Mediterranean Harbor area of Tokyo DisneySea.
 Tokyo Disneyland Hotel - Opened on July 8, 2008, as part of Tokyo Disney Resort's 25th anniversary celebrations. Like the Disneyland hotels in Paris and Hong Kong, the hotel is Victorian themed and is located adjacent to the entrance of Tokyo Disneyland Park.
 Tokyo Disney Celebration Hotel - Opened June 1, 2016 outside of the resort in nearby Shin-Urayasu.  The hotel was refurbished from the former Palm & Fountain Terrace Hotel. The hotel is divided across two buildings called Wish and Discover. The two properties complement each other but vary in theming. This is the only official Disney hotel not located in the Resort area.  A free 15-minute shuttle is available for guests.
Tokyo Disney Resort Toy Story Hotel - Opened April 5, 2022 and themed after Disney•Pixar's Toy Story franchise.
Tokyo DisneySea Fantasy Springs Hotel

Official HotelsSunroute Plaza TokyoTokyo Bay Maihama HotelTokyo Bay Maihama Hotel Club ResortHilton Tokyo BayHotel Okura Tokyo BaySheraton Grande Tokyo Bay Hotel'Source:

Incidents

Future Expansion

There are a number of planned or ongoing projects at the resort, including:

 Fantasy Springs, including Arendelle: World of Frozen, a new Tangled and Peter Pan''-themed area at Tokyo DisneySea. According to the press release, operations are projected to begin in fiscal year 2023.
A 475-room deluxe resort hotel, with an exclusive luxury wing, that will be connected to the Fantasy Springs port in Tokyo DisneySea.

See also

Large amusement railways
Rail transport in Walt Disney Parks and Resorts
Tourism in Japan

References

External links

 Tokyo Disney Resort web site in Japanese and English
 Resort Map in Japanese
 
 Joe's Tokyo Disney Resort Photo Site

 
1983 establishments in Japan
Amusement parks in Japan
Walt Disney Parks and Resorts
Tourist attractions in Chiba Prefecture
Urayasu, Chiba
Amusement parks opened in 1983